Music to Raise the Dead 1972–1998 is the 19th release from American Christian rock band Resurrection Band, released in July 2008 through Grrr Records. The box-set includes three CDs with 52 digitally re-mastered songs, an 80-page full-color booklet detailing the history of Rez Band with scores of photos, and one DVD with over an hour of previously unreleased live concert video footage and special features.

Track listing

Disc 1

Disc 2

Disc 3

Disc 4 (DVD)

Live in Concert
 "Military Man"
 "Afrikaans"
 "Attention"
 "Colours"
 "Players"
 "The Struggle"
 "White Noise"
 "Alienated"
 "Paint a Picture"
 "Love Comes Down"
 "Lovespeak"
 "In Your Arms"
 "Shadows"
 "Where Roses Grow"
 "Light/Light"
 "I Will Do My Last Singing in This Land Somewhere"

Special Features
 "Crimes" (Music Video)
 "Love Comes Down" (Music Video)
 "Surprised" (Music Video)
 Band Commentary

References 
 Music to Raise the Dead: 1972-1998 at The fish, by Russ Breimeier.
Music to Raise the Dead at Christianity Today by Andy Whitman.

Resurrection Band albums
2008 compilation albums
2008 video albums
2008 live albums
Live video albums